Travel Show could refer to a travel documentary, a genre of television show.  The term may also refer to:
 The Travel Show (TV series), a British television series
 The Travel Show, a 1999 EP by Braintax